Wide Bay was a Legislative Assembly electorate in the state of Queensland.

History

Wide Bay was one of the 16 original electorates of 1859; it centred on Maryborough but also included the coastal strip from the Mooloolah River, north to Bustard Head near Gladstone. However, in 1864, the Electoral district of Maryborough was established and the Wide Bay electorate contracted towards the south of Maryborough but still include the rural areas around Maryborough. Initially Wide Bay was a single member constituency, but from 1878 to 1888 it became a two-member constituency, after which it reverted to a single member. In the 1949 redistribution, taking effect in 1950, Wide Bay was abolished, being split up between the Electoral district of Marodian and the Electoral district of Nash.

1871

In the 1871 election held on 13 July, the sitting member for Wide Bay, Henry King, decided to contest the electoral district of Maryborough instead of Wide Bay. King supported the nomination of Horace Tozer for Wide Bay, amidst allegations that Tozer was just a "warming pan" intended to hold the seat as a protection against King failing to win Maryborough. Tozer was elected in Wide Bay but King's bid for Maryborough failed. The allegations of Tozer being a "warming pan" proved true as Tozer promptly resigned, recommending that the electors of Wide Bay should elect King at the subsequent by-election. King's nomination was unopposed and he was declared elected on 4 October 1871.

1898
On 2 March 1898, Horace Tozer resigned his seat in order to be appointed as Agent-General for Queensland. Charles Jenkinson was elected in the subsequent by-election.

Members
The electorate was represented by the following members:

 "warming pan", resigned to make way for Henry Edward King
 resigned to become Agent-General for Queensland
 won in by-election
 died in office

See also
 Electoral districts of Queensland
 Members of the Queensland Legislative Assembly by year
 :Category:Members of the Queensland Legislative Assembly by name

References

Former electoral districts of Queensland
1859 establishments in Australia
1950 disestablishments in Australia